Valentino Bertolini (18 January 1917 – 28 January 1967) was an Italian racewalker who competed at the 1948 Summer Olympics.

References

External links
 

1917 births
1967 deaths
Athletes (track and field) at the 1948 Summer Olympics
Italian male racewalkers
Olympic athletes of Italy
20th-century Italian people